The Tampere Theatre is one of the two main active theatres in Tampere, Finland, along with the Tampere Workers' Theatre. The theatre was started in 1904 and the opening ceremony was held in 1913.

The main location of the Tampere Theatre is located right in the centre of Tampere, opposite the municipality hall on the  shore of Tammerkoski. The building was designed in the National Romantic architecture style. The second location, called the Frenckell Hall, is also on the Tammerkoski shore in an old brick building in the Frenckell quarter.

See also
Tampere Theatre Festival

References

External links
 
 Official Tampere Theatre website

Theatres in Finland
Buildings and structures in Tampere
National Romantic architecture in Finland
Tourist attractions in Tampere
Art Nouveau theatres